Steven Baca is an American composer and songwriter. He is mostly known for his work on Heroes of Might and Magic series, working with Rob King and Paul Romero. In 90s he was songwriter and primary guitar player for alternative rock band Red Delicious, which also consisted of his HoMM colleague Rob King. While in group, Baca and King re-mixed some DJ dance songs, and those re-mixes were successful. He was also known as "Little Steven" when he was in Red Delicious.

Aside from working on HoMM, Baca also provided additional voices for Lords of EverQuest.

External links

Information on Red Delicious

American alternative rock musicians
21st-century American composers
American male composers
Living people
Heroes of Might and Magic
Video game composers
Year of birth missing (living people)